Moundsville Commercial Historic District is a national historic district located at Moundsville, Marshall County, West Virginia. It encompasses 72 contributing buildings in the central business district of Moundsville. They are large 2-4 story brick buildings reflecting the Georgian and Late Victorian styles. Notable buildings include the Marshall House (c. 1835), Roberts House (c. 1850), F.O.E. Building (1940), State Food Store (1939), Simpson United Methodist Church (1907), First Christian Church (1899), St. Francis Xavier Roman Catholic Church (1917), Strand Theater (1920), Marshall County Courthouse (1876), and Post Office and Federal Building (1914).  Located within the district is the separately listed Ferrell-Holt House.

It was listed on the National Register of Historic Places in 1998.

References

Historic districts on the National Register of Historic Places in West Virginia
Georgian architecture in West Virginia
Victorian architecture in West Virginia
Moundsville, West Virginia
National Register of Historic Places in Marshall County, West Virginia
Historic districts in Marshall County, West Virginia